William Perrett (born 1996) is a British male track cyclist who currently rides for Spellman Dublin Port  cycling team. He previously rode for HUUB-Wattbike Test Team.

Cycling career
Perrett became a British team champion after winning the Team Pursuit Championship at the 2020 British National Track Championships. He followed up his first National title by subsequently winning the British National Derny Championships in 2021 and the British National Madison Championships with Mark Stewart in 2022.

Perrett won his third national title at the 2023 British Cycling National Track Championships, he won the Points race for the first time.

Major results
2020
 National Track Championships
1st  Team pursuit
3rd Points race
2021
 1st  Derny, National Track Championships
2022
 National Track Championships
1st  Madison (with Mark Stewart)
2nd Team pursuit
2023
 1st  Points race, National Track Championships
 3rd  Omnium, UEC European Track Championships

References

1996 births
Living people
British male cyclists
British track cyclists
21st-century British people